mYngle is an online language learning service provider for business professionals. Based in the Netherlands, they provide one to one lessons through an online virtual classroom.

History

Myngle was launched in December 2007, based on the experience of its founder Marina Tognetti. She found it hard to study Chinese because of the lack of qualified teachers in her area and a proper learning environment, as well as the flexibility needed to accommodate her busy working schedule. This gave Tognetti the idea to create a company where technology would allow students to take language lessons from teachers located in any part of the world. She resigned from her job at eBay, where she was in the management team for 4 years, and started Myngle.

Applications

Myngle uses a toolkit for synchronous learning, which consists of VoIP in combination with an integrated whiteboard, feedback and a community environment.

Financing

In March 2009, Myngle secured €950,000 ($1.25 million) in the form of a bank loan from Rabobank. The Dutch government, through an innovation program, backed the loan. This was Myngle's second round of financing. On the first round Myngle was able to secure an €800,000 seed investment from the HenQ fund and private individuals.

Awards

 FEM Business Top 5 Start up Media in the Netherlands, in June 2009
 Plugg Conference's People's choice award, in March 2009
 Best ICT Company at the European Venture Summit, in December 2008
 Accenture Innovation award in October 2008

References

Social networking language-learning websites
Dutch educational websites
Internet properties established in 2007